Thyrocopa peleana is a moth of the family Xyloryctidae. It is endemic to the Hawaiian island of Oahu. It may be extinct.

The length of the forewings is 11–19 mm. Adults are on wing at least in September. The ground color of the forewings is very light whitish brown, with a few dark brown scales scattered throughout. The discal area has three to four small, brownish spots in the cell. The hindwings are very light whitish brown.

The larvae feed on Melicope species. Larvae have been reared from caterpillars in burrows of the longicorn beetle, Nesithmysus bridwelli in Melicope trees. The larvae feed in decaying wood and on bark around the entrance to the burrows, spinning a sheet-like web to cover the feeding area.

External links

Thyrocopa
Endemic moths of Hawaii
Moths described in 1932